The rufous-backed fantail (Rhipidura rufidorsa) is a species of bird in the family Rhipiduridae.
It is found in New Guinea.
Its natural habitat is subtropical or tropical moist lowland forests.

References

rufous-backed fantail
Birds of New Guinea
rufous-backed fantail
Taxonomy articles created by Polbot